The discography of Eurythmics, a British rock/pop duo, consists of eight studio albums, one live album, two compilation albums, one soundtrack album, one extended play, and thirty-three singles. Their first studio album, In the Garden, was released in 1981 but they did not gain any commercial success until their second album, Sweet Dreams (Are Made of This), released in 1983. The album reached number three in the UK and was certified platinum. The album's title track was released as a single, and reached #2 in the UK and #1 in the United States and Canada. Later in 1983, the duo released their third album, Touch. It topped the UK album chart, and produced three UK top 10 singles; "Who's That Girl?", "Right by Your Side", and "Here Comes the Rain Again".

In 1984, Eurythmics released the soundtrack album 1984 (For the Love of Big Brother) which included the UK and Australian Top 5 hit "Sexcrime (Nineteen Eighty-Four)". Their next studio album, 1985's Be Yourself Tonight, peaked at #3 in the UK, spent 4 weeks at #1 in Australia, and went double platinum in both the UK and Canada. The singles "There Must Be an Angel (Playing with My Heart)" topped the UK chart, and “Would I Lie To You?” topped the Australian chart. The duo continued their chart success with the album Revenge in 1986, which also peaked at number three in the UK, and went double platinum in the UK and Canada.  The album reached #2 in Australia spending 40 weeks in the top 10.

Eurythmics released their next studio album, Savage, in 1987, which peaked at number seven in the UK, reaching platinum status. In 1989, they released the album We Too Are One, which reached #1 in the UK and reached double platinum status. In 1990, the duo informally disbanded and their Greatest Hits album was released in 1991. It topped the UK album chart for 10 weeks, and the Australian chart for 7 weeks, achieving six times platinum in the UK and triple platinum in the US, Canada and Australia.

Eurythmics reunited in 1999 and released their eighth and final studio album, Peace, which peaked at number four on the UK chart. A second greatest hits album, Ultimate Collection, was released in 2005, reaching the UK Top 5 and has been certified triple platinum. Overall, the duo have sold over 75 million records worldwide. (That is not an official source for number of records sold. Provide a recognized music industry, such as RIAA)

Albums

Studio albums

Live albums

Compilation albums

Soundtrack albums

Box sets

Extended plays

Singles

Videography

Video albums/collections

Promo videos

Other appearances

References

Discographies of British artists
Electronic music discographies
Pop music group discographies
Rock music group discographies
New wave discographies
Disco